Maquan River or Dangque Zangbu is the upper section of Yarlung Tsangpo.

The rainiest month is July, with an average of  rainfall, and the driest is April, with  precipitation.

References

Rivers of Tibet
Ngari Prefecture
Brahmaputra River